Ernst Wilhelm Ludvig Karlberg (12 October 1901 – 20 March 1987) was a Swedish ice hockey player who competed in the 1924 Winter Olympics and in the 1928 Winter Olympics.

In 1924 he finished fourth with the Swedish team in the first Winter Olympics ice hockey tournament.

Four years later he was a member of the Swedish ice hockey team, which won the silver medal.

Karlberg was part of the Djurgården Swedish champions' team of 1926.

References

External links 
 

1901 births
1987 deaths
Djurgårdens IF Hockey players
Ice hockey players at the 1924 Winter Olympics
Ice hockey players at the 1928 Winter Olympics
Medalists at the 1928 Winter Olympics
Olympic ice hockey players of Sweden
Olympic medalists in ice hockey
Olympic silver medalists for Sweden